Léo Piquette (born May 22, 1946) was elected to the Alberta Legislative Assembly in the 1986 Alberta election. He was a member of the Alberta New Democratic Party for the district of Athabasca-Lac La Biche from 1986 to 1989.

Piquette is largely remembered for what would come to be known as the "Piquette Affair." On April 7, 1987, Piquette attempted to ask a question in French in the Legislative Assembly of Alberta. Speaker David J. Carter twice prevented him from asking the question, ruling that English was the only language permitted in the legislature. Piquette appeared before a special hearing of the legislature's Election and Privilege Committee to argue the legislature had a duty to let members speak both English and French. He relied on section 110 of the Northwest Territories Act, which provided that members of the Northwest Territories legislature could use both English and French in debates. Piquette reasoned that the Act (which governed the territory that contained Alberta before Alberta became a province in 1905) had never been repealed, and was still in effect.

The incident sparked two rallies at the legislature in April and December 1987, where hundreds of francophones from across Alberta demonstrated in support of francophone language rights. 
In February 1988, the Supreme Court of Canada released its decision in R. v. Mercure, [1988] 1 S.C.R. 234. The Court ruled that s. 110 continued in force in both Saskatchewan and Alberta but also held that the legislatures of those provinces could unilaterally modify these language rights. The Alberta Legislature responded by allowing members to speak in French, but only if they provided the Speaker with a written translation of their comments, in advance.

After his electoral defeat in 1989, Léo Piquette stayed active in the francophone community and provincial politics. In 1994, he helped pioneer francophone education in Alberta after the Alberta government granted francophone parents the right to francophone schools. He became a school board member of the Conseil Scolaire Centre-Est in 1994 and was Chair of the Board until 2004 when he was elected as President of the Fédération des Conseils Scolaires de l'Alberta. He was also a founding member and President of the Chambre Économique de l'Alberta. He is currently the Alberta Director for RRDEE Canada, a group of businesspeople who work with the federal government to implement bilingualism policies throughout Canada.

His son Colin Piquette served as NDP MLA from 2015 to 2019.

References

Léo Piquette Biography
The Piquette affair
 

Franco-Albertan people
Living people
Alberta New Democratic Party MLAs
1946 births